Babak Hodjat (born in 1967) was the co-founder and CEO of Sentient Technologies and now holds the position of Vice President of Evolutionary AI at Cognizant. He is a specialist in the field of artificial intelligence and machine learning.

Biography

Career in science
Babak Hodjat was born in 1967 in Wimbledon (London). He studied at Sharif University of Technology from 1986 to 1995 and received his Master of Science degree in software engineering. In 1994, together with another computer department student Hormoz Shahrzad  presented their research titled Introducing a dynamic problem solving scheme based on a learning algorithm in artificial life environments at the first IEEE Conference on Computational Intelligence held at Orlando.

Hodjat received a PhD in machine intelligence from Kyushu University in 2003  During his time  there, he published several works on adaptive agent oriented software architecture and natural language user interfaces.

Career in business
Hodjat moved to California in 1998 and founded Dejima Inc. (named after the historic Japanese Dejima artificial island). The firm was based on a patented adaptive agent-oriented software engineering platform developed by Hodjat, Christopher J. Savoie and Makoto Amamiya. Hodjat served as the CTO and as the CEO for 9 months from October 2000. By 2000 the company had offices in San Jose, London and  Tokyo.

In 2002, the company developed a voice control Natural Interaction Platform (NPI) in collaboration with the Stanford University's research group Archimedes Project. During these years Hodjat continued his research on agent oriented software architecture and natural language user interfaces. In July 2003, Dejima got funding from SRI International within the Cognitive Assistant that Learns and Organizes (CALO) project of DARPA and worked on a Perceptive Assistant that Learns (PAL) initiative.  Hodjat was the primary inventor of the firm's  agent-oriented technology applied to intelligent interfaces for mobile and enterprise computing – a technology that eventually led to Siri.

In April 2004, Dejima was acquired by Sybase iAnywhere. Hodjat served as Senior Director of Engineering at Sybase iAnywhere from 2004 to 2008, where he developed  AvantGo Platform,  and Answers Anywhere.

In 2007, he teamed with Antoine Blondeau (former CEO of Dejima) and Adam Cheyer (Dejima's vice president and Chief Architect of the CALO project) to establish Genetic Finance Holding Ltd. (where he began as CTO). In 2014 the firm became Sentient Technologies. Hodjat was joined by his long-time research fellow Hormoz Shahrzad who became Principal Scientist, while Hodjat held the position of Chief Scientist.

In the following years Hodjat has worked on developing massively distributed computing technology and improving machine-learning technique known as evolutionary algorithms. One area that gained special attention from the press was applying Sentient Technologies algorithms to a stock market trading through specially created Sentient Investment Management hedge fund.

Following the management change within Sentient Technologies, Hodjat became the company's CEO in February 2017. He continues his business and educational projects (he was on the jury of IBM Watson AI XPRIZE and the Merit Awards committee for the ISAL Award).

Writing 
Hodjat is the author of The Konar and the Apple: Fun, Beauty, and Dread--From Ahwaz to California (January 2022). An eight-year-old boy assigned the task of throwing flowers during the Shah's visit. A teenager in boot camp eager to catch episodes of a popular Japanese TV show. An adult coming to the United States, ready to make his mark in the tech world.

These are just some of the personal experiences shaping Hodjat's intimate narrative of a boy growing up in post-revolutionary Iran. The stories paint a picture of a middle-class, westernized boy experiencing all the common—and uncommon—adventures of childhood and self-discovery.

Blending both humor and insight, The Konar and the Apple transcends culture to celebrate the fun, innocence, and anticipation of growing up that unite us all.

Selected publications

Patents 
Babak Hodjat holds 21 patents in the fields of agent-oriented programming, natural language decision engines, distributed evolutionary algorithms for asset management and trading and data mining.

References

External links
 Babak Hodjat profile at Sentient Technology website
 Babak Hodjat Twitter profile

Living people
Artificial intelligence researchers
American technology chief executives
Businesspeople in software
21st-century American businesspeople
Sharif University of Technology alumni
1967 births
American computer scientists
Iranian computer scientists
American technology company founders
Kyushu University alumni
Machine learning researchers
People from Wimbledon, London